Yilong may refer to :

Yilong Lake (异龙湖), in Shiping County, Yunnan, China
Yilong County (仪陇县), of Nanchong, Sichuan, China
Yilong, Yi'an County (依龙镇), town in Heilongjiang, China
Yi Long (born 1987), Chinese kickboxer

See also
eLong